Ellen James may refer to:

Ellen James Society
Ellen James, the fictional inspiration for a feminist community, the Ellen Jamesians, in the novel The World According to Garp